Provincial road N214 is a Dutch provincial road in the province South Holland.

See also

References

External links

214